Marco Antonio Marsulo Junior (born 5 April 2002), commonly known as Marquinho, is a Brazilian footballer who plays as a midfielder for Chapecoense.

Club career
Born in São José do Rio Pardo, São Paulo, Marquinho started his career at the age of 13 with São Paulo. He subsequently represented Juventus-SP and Cruzeiro before joining Chapecoense in 2021.

Marquinho made his first team – and Série A – debut on 10 October 2021, coming on as a second-half substitute for Geuvânio in a 2–5 away loss against Internacional.

Career statistics

References

External links
Chapecoense profile 

2002 births
Living people
Footballers from São Paulo (state)
Brazilian footballers
Association football midfielders
Campeonato Brasileiro Série A players
Associação Chapecoense de Futebol players
People from São José do Rio Pardo